Enteromius serengetiensis is a species of ray-finned fish in the  family Cyprinidae. It is found only in Tanzania. Its natural habitats are rivers and intermittent rivers.

References

Enteromius
Endemic freshwater fish of Tanzania
Taxa named by Brian P. Farm
Fish described in 2000
Taxonomy articles created by Polbot